Christopher Bakken (born 1967 in Madison, Wisconsin) an American poet, translator, chef, travel writer, and professor at Allegheny College.

He graduated from Columbia University with an M.F.A. and from University of Houston with a Ph.D. in literature and creative writing. He was a Fulbright Scholar in American Studies at the University of Bucharest in 2008.  He is Director of Writing Workshops in Greece: Thessaloniki and Thasos.

His work has appeared in The Paris Review, Georgia Review, Gettysburg Review, Wall Street Journal, Michigan Quarterly Review, The Iowa Review, Parnassus, Raritan, Southwest Review, and Western Humanities Review. His first poetry collection, After Greece (2001), was published by Truman State University Press after he won the T. S. Eliot Prize.

His burger recipe won a Food & Wine contest.

Works
 "Confession" The Missouri Review 2012
 "Some Things Along Strada C.A. Rosetti", Parnassus: Poetry in Review via Poetry Daily.  2009.
"Portrait Detail, with Pear",  AGNI 2006
"Lesvos" Academy of American Poets 2016
"Driving the Beast." Academy of American Poets 2017
"Gorgona." Juxtaprose

Books

 Eternity & Oranges. Pitt Poetry Series, 2016.  
 Honey, Olives, Octopus: Adventures at the Greek Table University of California Press, 2013, 
 Goat Funeral Sheep Meadow Press, 2006, 
 After Greece Truman State University Press, 2001, 

Influences/Like Voices

Constantine Cavafy
Patrick Leigh Fermor
James Merrill
Yannis Ritsos
Walt Whitman

Translations
 The Lions’ Gate: Selected Poems of Titos Patrikios, Translated Christopher Bakken, Roula Konsolaki, Truman State University Press, 2006,

Anthologies
 Kindled Terraces: American Poets in Greece, Truman State University Press, 2004.  
 "Ohio Elegy", Poets against the War, Editors Sam Hamill, Sally Anderson, Thunder's Mouth Press, 2003, 
 "Home Thoughts, from Abroad", Under the rock umbrella: contemporary American poets, 1951–1977, Editor William J. Walsh, Mercer University Press, 2006,

Review

 Review of Eternity & Oranges in The Literary Review
 Review of Eternity & Oranges at American Microreviews
If Bakken can, in the future, stay put in his resplendent Hellenic-inflected imagination for a good while, and avoid the art museum and his personal library, he may just write a book with the smell, taste, and texture of ambrosia. Goat Funeral isn’t quite that, but it’s not chopped liver, either.

Awards
2008 Fulbright Scholar: University of Bucharest
2005 Willis Barnstone Translation Prize
2006 Helen C. Smith Memorial Prize by the Texas Institute of Letters
2001 T. S. Eliot Prize for Poetry for After Greece.

References

External links
Review of HONEY, OLIVES, OCTOPUS in Wall Street Journal
Hunting for Octopus and Cooking for Michael Pollan
"#3 – Christopher Bakken", First Book Interviews, October 13, 2008

Poets from Wisconsin
1967 births
Writers from Madison, Wisconsin
Columbia University School of the Arts alumni
University of Houston alumni
Allegheny College faculty
Academic staff of the University of Bucharest
Writers from Pennsylvania
Living people
21st-century American poets